The Persistence of Memory is the fourth studio album by the rock band Emigrate. It was released on November 12, 2021, through Sony Music Entertainment. Recording sessions took place at Studio Engine 55 in Berlin, at Funkhaus-Studio in Berlin-Treptow-Köpenick, and at Sky Van Hoff Studios. Production was handled by Richard Kruspe, Sky Van Hoff and Olsen Involtini. It features a guest appearance from Till Lindemann. The album debuted at number 39 on the Offizielle Deutsche Charts.

Music videos were released for "Freeze My Mind" and "You Can't Run Away", both directed by Anuk Rohde, and "I'm Still Alive", directed by David Gesslbauer.

Track listing

Notes
 Track 4 is also known as "Yeah Yeah Yeah"

Personnel

Richard Kruspe – lyrics & music (tracks: 1, 3-9), producer
Terrence Matlin – lyrics (tracks: 1, 3-9)
Caron Bernstein – lyrics (track 1)
Johnny Christopher – lyrics & music (track 2)
Mark James – lyrics & music (track 2)
Wayne Carson Thompson – lyrics & music (track 2)
Ghøstkid – backing vocals
Margaux Bossieux – backing vocals
Maxim Alaska Kruspe Bossieux – backing vocals
Marcel Caccamese – backing vocals (track 1)
Matthias Schmitt – backing vocals (track 1)
Till Lindemann – vocals (track 2)
Arnaud Giroux – bass, artwork
Sky Van Hoff – bass, producer, recording, mixing
Ufo Walter – bass (track 6)
Jens Dreesen – drums (tracks: 1, 5), mastering
Mikko Sirén – drums (tracks: 2, 4, 6-9)
Henka Johansson – drums (track 3)
Leon Pfeiffer – additional percussion (track 6)
Olsen Involtini – producer, recording
Anne Rebenstorff – management
Sven Kaselow – management

Charts

References

External links
 

2021 albums
Emigrate (band) albums